Mariveles Reef (Mandarin ), is located in the SW of Dangerous Ground in the Spratly Islands.

It dries at high tide enclosing two large lagoons in a figure of eight formation with a sand cay between them. This small cay, 1.5–2 m high, and some isolated rocks are just visible at high water.

It is one of the areas in the Spratly Islands occupied by Malaysia. The Royal Malaysian Navy has maintained an "offshore naval station" there called "Station Mike" since 1986. The reef is also claimed by the People's Republic of China, Republic of China (Taiwan), the Philippines, and Vietnam.

References

External links
 Asia Maritime Transparency Initiative Island Tracker

Reefs of the Spratly Islands